Secusio atrizonata is a moth in the family Erebidae. It was described by George Hampson in 1910. It is found in Zambia.

References

Endemic fauna of Zambia
Moths described in 1910
Arctiini